Lettere di una novizia (internationally released as Letters by a Novice and Rita) is a 1960 Italian drama film directed by Alberto Lattuada. It is loosely based on the novel with the same title by Guido Piovene. The film was coproduced by France, where it was released with the title La novice.

Cast 
Pascale Petit: Margherita Passi
Jean Paul Belmondo: Giuliano Verdi
Massimo Girotti: Don Paolo Conti
Hella Petri: Elisa Passi
Elsa Vazzoler: Zaira Michetti
Lilla Brignone: madre superiora
Emilio Cigoli: pubblico ministero

References

External links

Letters by a Novice at Le film guide

1960 films
Films directed by Alberto Lattuada
1960 drama films
Italian drama films
Films based on Italian novels
1960s Italian-language films
1960s Italian films